Pain Lamin Jub (also Romanized as Pā’īn Lamīn Jūb; also known as Pā’īn Līman Jūb, Līman Jūb, and Līman Jūb-e Pā’īn) is a village in Bibalan Rural District, Kelachay District, Rudsar County, Gilan Province, Iran. At the 2006 census, its population was 211, in 58 families.

References 

Populated places in Rudsar County